Robin Hood is a famous English folk hero and legendary outlaw.

Robin Hood may also refer to:

Places 
 Robin Hood, Drouin, Victoria, Australia
 Robinhood, Saskatchewan, Canada
 Robinhood Bay, Newfoundland, Canada
 Robin Hood, West Yorkshire, England
 Robin Hood, one of the Crookdale Horseshoe group of hills in Cumbria, England
 Robin Hood Gardens a residential estate in London, England
 Robin Hood Hills, Nottinghamshire, England
 Doncaster Sheffield Airport, South Yorkshire, England, formerly known as Robin Hood Airport
 Robin Hood Hills, West Memphis, Arkansas, U.S.
 Robinhood, Mississippi, U.S.

Arts and entertainment

Ballets 
 Robin Hood (ballet), a 1998 ballet by Paul Vasterling
 Robin Hood, a 1985 ballet by Ilkka Kuusisto

Fictional characters
 Robin Hood (DC Comics), version of the character in DC Comics
 Robin Hood (Disney character), character in the 1973 Disney film Robin Hood
 Robin Hood (Once Upon a Time), a character from the ABC television series Once Upon a Time

Films

 Robin Hood (1912 film), a silent film
 Robin Hood (1922 film), a silent film starring Douglas Fairbanks
 Robin Hood (1973 film), a Disney animated film
 Robin Hood (1991 British film), a TV movie featuring Patrick Bergin and Uma Thurman
 Robin Hood: Prince of Thieves, a 1991 film starring Kevin Costner
 Robin Hood: Men in Tights, a 1993 parody film directed by Mel Brooks
 Robin Hood (2009 film), a Malayalam film starring Prithviraj
 Robin Hood (2010 film), directed by Ridley Scott and starring Russell Crowe and Cate Blanchett
 Robin Hood (2018 film), directed by Otto Bathurst and starring Taron Egerton and Jamie Foxx

Gaming 
 Robin Hood: Prince of Thieves (video game), a 1991 NES tie-in for the Kevin Costner film
 Robin Hood: The Legend of Sherwood, a 2002 strategy computer game developed by Spellbound Studios
 Robin Hood: Defender of the Crown, a 2003 video game made by Cinemaware and Capcom

Operas
 Robin Hood, a 1750 opera, music by Charles Burney (under the Temple of Apollo banner), libretto by Moses Mendez
 Robin Hood, a 1784 opera, music by William Shield, libretto by L. McNally and E. Lysaght
 Robin Hood, an 1860 opera, music by George Macfarren, libretto by John Oxenford
 Robin Hood (De Koven opera), composed by Reginald De Koven, lyrics by Harry B. Smith, and Clement Scott in 1888–1889
 Robin Hood (Tippett opera), a 1934 ballad opera by Michael Tippett
 Robin Hood, a 2011 opera by Jukka Linkola

Television 
 Robin Hood (1953 TV series), a BBC TV series starring Patrick Troughton
 The Adventures of Robin Hood (TV series), British TV series 1955-60 starring Richard Greene
 Robin Hood (1990 TV series), a Japanese anime series that aired on NHK
 Robin Hood (2006 TV series), a BBC TV series starring Jonas Armstrong
 Robin of Sherwood (or Robin Hood), a 1980s British TV series created by Richard Carpenter

Other arts and entertainment 
 Robin Hood (album), the soundtrack to the Robin of Sherwood British TV series
 Robin Hood, a young adults novel series by Robert Muchamore
  Robin Hood a single by Louis Prima (1944)

Brands and enterprises
Robin Hood (bicycle company), an English manufacturer
Robin Hood Aviation, a defunct Austrian airline
Robin Hood Engineering, a British kit car manufacturer
Robin Hood Energy, energy company owned by Nottingham City Council
Robin Hood F.C., a Bermudan soccer club
Robin Hood Flour, a Canadian flour brand owned by Cargill
Robin Hood Foundation, a nonprofit charitable organization which attempts to alleviate problems caused by poverty in New York City
S.V. Robinhood, a Surinamese football club
Robinhood Markets, a financial services company

Other uses 
Robin Hood (golfer) (born 1964), American professional golfer
Robin Hood (roller coaster), an attraction at Walibi Holland theme park
Robin Hood (ship), a British tea clipper built in 1856
Robin Hood (train), a British passenger train
Robin Hood v. United States, a 2012 court case

See also
2019 Baltimore ransomware attack, achieved using RobbinHood ransomware
Robin Hood effect, the result in economics of an income redistribution scheme
Robin Hood plan, a school funding system in Texas
Robin Hood tax, referring to a proposed tax on financial transactions